Pakoda Kadhar was an Indian actor who appeared in Tamil films (Kollywood) in comedic and supportive roles. He acted in over 200 films in the Tamil language during the decades 1960s, 1970s, 1980s. He is notable for his comedian roles along with actors Nagesh, Suruli Rajan and Thengai Srinivasan.  Some of his notable movies are Madras To Pondicherry, Raman Ethanai Ramanadi,  Aalayam, Anbalippu, Deiveega Uravu, Kann Malar and Murugan Kaattiya Vazhi.

Family 
He has a wife Mumtaz and only son, Nagoor Moideen.

Death 
He died of heart disease on 21 January 1998.

Partial filmography 
This is a partial filmography. You can expand it.

1960s

1970s

1980s

1990s

References

External links 
 

Year of birth missing
1998 deaths
Indian male film actors
Indian comedians
Tamil comedians
Tamil actors